This is a list of notable persons who were born in and/or have lived in the American city of Asheville, North Carolina.

Art and literature
 Sarah Addison Allen, New York Times bestselling author
 Ruth and Latrobe Carroll (1899–1999; 1894–1996), children's authors and illustrators
 Evan Dahm, webcomic creator
 Olive Tilford Dargan (1869–1968), proletarian novelist of the 1930s under the pen name "Fielding Burke"
 John Ehle (1925–2018), author
 Charles Frazier (born 1950), author
 Gail Godwin (born 1938), novelist, spent her early years in Asheville with mother Kathleen Krahenbuhl Cole
 O. Henry (1862–1910), pen name of author William Sydney Porter; lived for a while in Asheville and is buried in Riverside Cemetery
 Hope Larson (born 1982), Eisner Award-winning illustrator, cartoonist and author of graphic novels Salamander Dream and Chiggers
 Kenneth Noland (1924–2010), abstract painter, one of the best-known American Color Field painters
 Bryan Lee O'Malley (born 1976), Canadian cartoonist and creator of Scott Pilgrim graphic novel series
 Jonathan Williams (1908–1929), poet and publisher
 Thomas Wolfe (1900–1938), author, born and raised in Asheville, buried in Riverside Cemetery

Entertainment
 Harry Anderson (1952–2018), actor, starred in nine seasons of NBC's Night Court
 Clint Basinger (born 1986), YouTuber
 Mark Boswell (born 1960), film director
 Joe Bowman (1925–2009), bootmaker and marksman of American West entertainment; grew up in Asheville but left for Houston, Texas, in 1937
 Chris Chalk, television, film, and theater actor, born in Asheville and graduated from Asheville High School
 Jim David, stand-up comedian and playwright, both in Asheville
 Jim Eason (born 1935), radio talk show host
Maria Fletcher (born 1942), Miss America 1962.
 Eileen Fulton (born 1933), actress, starred on the CBS soap As the World Turns, 1960–2010; born in Asheville
 Joel Goffin (born 1981), film composer, music producer
 Perla Haney-Jardine (born 1997), actress
 Dorothy Hart (1922–2004), screen actress, known mostly for supporting roles
 William S. Hart (1864–1946), cowboy actor in early Hollywood; resided in Asheville around 1900 and coached shows at the Asheville Opera House
 Shirley Hemphill (1947–1999), stand-up comedian and actress, best known for What's Happening!!, 1976–79
 Charlton Heston (1923–2008), Oscar-winning actor, managed the Asheville Community Theatre with his wife Lydia in 1947
 Taras Kulakov (born 1987), YouTuber
 Daliah Lavi, (1942-2017), German singer who lived th last 27 years of her life in Asheville.
 Andie MacDowell (born 1958), actress, lived for several years in Biltmore Forest, adjacent to Asheville
 Sierra McCormick (born 1997), actress
 Marjorie Rambeau (1889–1970), Hollywood actress; was married to Francis A. Gudger, a resident of Asheville; resided in Asheville in the winter from 1932 to the mid-1940s
 Paul Schneider (born 1976), actor
 Angela Shelton (born 1972), actress and producer
 Duncan Trussell (born 1974), actor and comedian
 Bellamy Young (born 1970), actress, co-star of television series Scandal; born and raised in Asheville

Government and politics
 William Jennings Bryan (1860–1925), 20th-century politician, presidential candidate
 Mark B. Childress (born 1959), former United States Ambassador to Tanzania and former Deputy Chief of Staff for Planning in the administration of President Obama
 Wilma Dykeman (1920–2006), author and Southern liberal activist
 Bill Hendon (1944–2018), author, POW/MIA activist, and two-term U.S. Congressman from North Carolina
 Floyd McKissick, lawyer and civil rights activist who led the Congress of Racial Equality for a time and founded Soul City, North Carolina
 Dan K. Moore (1906–1986), 66th Governor of North Carolina from 1965 to 1969
 Mary Cordell Nesbitt (1911–1979), served in the North Carolina House of Representatives
 James W. Reid (1917–1972), served as the Mayor of Raleigh, North Carolina
 Robert Rice Reynolds (1884–1963), U.S. Senator of isolationist sympathies in World War II
 Joseph Tydings (1928–2018), lawyer and politician
 Marie Colton (1922-2018), first female Speaker Pro Tempore of the North Carolina House of Represenatives. 
 William Winkenwerder, Jr. (born 1954), Assistant Secretary of Defense for Health Affairs (2001–2007)

Musicians
 Greg Cartwright (born 1970), rock musician; relocated to Asheville 
 Luke Combs, country music singer-songwriter, graduated from A.C. Reynolds High School
 Jermaine Dupri (born 1972), rapper 
 Backwards Sam Firk (1943–2007), country blues singer, fingerstyle guitarist, songwriter, and record collector
 Roberta Flack (born 1937), Grammy Award-winning singer, born in Asheville
 Sallie Ford, of Sallie Ford and the Sound Outside, singer
 Warren Haynes (born 1960), musician, spent formative years in Asheville
 David Holt (born 1946), folk musician, lives near Asheville
 Caleb Johnson (born 1991), American Idol Season 13 winner
 Gary Jules (born 1969), singer-songwriter, known for rendition of "Mad World" for film Donnie Darko
 Bascom Lamar Lunsford (1882–1973), folklorist, musician, folk festival founder
 Bill Monroe (1911–1996), musician, known as "the father of bluegrass"; lived in Asheville; had a show on a local radio station in 1939
 Robert Moog (1934–2005), pioneer of electronic music, inventor of the Moog synthesizer
 Angel Olsen (born 1987), musician
 Chase Rice (born 1985), country music singer-songwriter
 Jimmie Rodgers, singer, known as "the father of country music"; lived in Asheville; had a show on a local radio station in 1927
 Root Boy Slim, aka Foster Mackenzie III (1945–1993), blues musician
 Nina Simone (1933–2003), jazz singer, attended Allen Home School for Girls in Asheville
 Moses Sumney (born 1992), singer-songwriter
 David Wilcox (born 1958), folk musician and singer-songwriter

Military
 Donald V. Bennett (1915–2005), former commanding general of the US Army Pacific Command
 Kathleen M. Gainey (born 1956), retired US Army Lieutenant General
 Hugh B. Hester (1895–1983), retired Army general who opposed the Vietnam War and the Cold War
 Robert Morgan (1918–2004), pilot of the Memphis Belle, the famed World War II B-17 bomber
 Kiffin Rockwell (1892–1916), aviator; pilot in the Lafayette Escadrille; first American to shoot down an enemy aircraft
 Zachary Taylor Wood (1860–1915), Assistant Commissioner of North-West Mounted Police and Commissioner of Yukon Territory

Sportspeople
 Chad Allegra, professional wrestler; signed to Impact Wrestling under ring name Karl Anderson
 John Avery (born 1976), football player in NFL, XFL, and CFL; attended Asheville High School
 Crezdon Butler (born 1987), NFL cornerback for Pittsburgh Steelers; born and raised in Asheville; led Asheville High School to 2006 state championship
 Adam "Edge" Copeland (born 1973), professional wrestler, author, relocated to Asheville
 Brad Daugherty (born 1965), retired NBA basketball player, 5-time All-Star, ESPN NASCAR analyst
 Rico Dowdle (born 1998), NFL running back
 Lawson Duncan (born 1964), former Grand Prix tennis tour player
 Eddie Golden (born 1973), professional wrestler, resides in Asheville
 Evan Golden (born 2000), professional wrestler, born and raised in Asheville
 Darren Holmes (born 1966), MLB player for eight teams
 Jack Ingram, retired NASCAR driver
 Hughie Jennings (1869–1928), Major League Baseball player and manager, 1891–1925
 Charlie "Choo Choo" Justice (1924–2003), professional football player
 Loyd King (born 1949), retired professional basketball player
 Stephen Leicht (born 1987), NASCAR driver
 Leonard Little (born 1974), NFL football player with St. Louis Rams; born and raised in Asheville
 Rhonda Mapp (born 1969), WNBA player
 Cameron Maybin (born 1987), Major League Baseball player with Los Angeles Angels; born and raised in Asheville
 Rashad McCants (born 1984), NBA basketball player for Minnesota Timberwolves and Sacramento Kings; former Erwin High School basketball player
 Rashanda McCants (born 1986), WNBA player, younger sister of Rashad McCants
 Dorothy Montgomery (1924–2009), All-American Girls Professional Baseball League player
 Chris Narveson (born 1981), MLB pitcher
 Buzz Peterson (born 1963), former director of player personnel for NBA's Charlotte Bobcats; head basketball coach at UNC Wilmington; born and raised in Asheville
 Beth Phoenix (born 1980), real name Elizabeth Copeland; retired professional wrestler, four-time women's champion, and commentator; relocated to Asheville
 Robert Pressley (born 1959), retired NASCAR driver, born in Asheville
 Stephen Rerych (born 1946), Olympic gold medalist in swimming
 Ray Roberts (born 1969), retired NFL player
 Jonathan Rush (born 1989), American football offensive lineman
 Ronnie Silver (born 1951), NASCAR driver
 Brett Swain (born 1986), NFL player for Green Bay Packers
 Don Thompson (1923–2009), Major League Baseball player for the Brooklyn Dodgers
 Nate Torbett (born 1994), professional soccer player for Coomera Colts SC
 Joe West (born 1952), MLB umpire for record-breaking 40 seasons
 Cash Wheeler (born 1987), real name Daniel Wheeler; professional wrestler for All Elite Wrestling. Born and raised in Asheville, where he currently resides.
 Roy Williams (born 1950), University of North Carolina at Chapel Hill basketball coach, raised in Asheville

Other
 Dorothy Hansine Andersen, physician; first person to identify cystic fibrosis; inducted into National Women's Hall of Fame in 2002 for scientific work
 Elizabeth Blackwell (1821–1910), first recognized woman doctor in the United States
 Alice A. W. Cadwallader (1832-1910), philanthropist and temperance activist
 Jennifer Pharr Davis (born 1982), long-distance hiker; unofficial record holder of fastest through-hike of Appalachian Trail
 John E. Exner, psychologist
 Zelda Fitzgerald (1900–1948), wife of F. Scott Fitzgerald; died in a fire with eight other women at Highland Hospital, an Asheville mental institution in the Montford district
 Edythe J. Gaines (1922–2006), educator and school superintendent
 Edwin Wiley Grove (1850–1927), patent medicine inventor, builder and owner of the Grove Park Inn
 Rafael Guastavino (1842–1908), architect; final resting place at the Basilica of St. Lawrence, Asheville
 Howard Kester (1904–1977), author and organizer of the Southern Tenant Farmers Union
 Berniece Baker Miracle (1919–2014), writer and half-sister of Marilyn Monroe
 Doan Ogden (1908–1989), nationally noted landscape architect during the 20th century
 William Dudley Pelley (1890–1965), leader of the "Silver Shirt" fascist movement in the 1930s and 1940s
 Michael Robinson (1924–2006), American Reform rabbi and civil rights activist
 Ashleigh Shanti, chef
 George Washington Vanderbilt II (1862–1914), entrepreneur, founder of the Biltmore Estate

See also

 List of people from North Carolina

References

Asheville, North Carolina
Asheville